The Jizan Dam, also spelled Jazan, is a gravity dam on Wadi Jizan about  northeast of Abu `Arish in Jizan Province of southwest Saudi Arabia. It has several purpose to include irrigation and flood control. Located in a desert, the dam collects run-off and stores it for periodic releases downstream. Crops grown include sorghum with eucalyptus and tamarisk grown for anti-desertification. The dam was completed in 1970 and is owned by the Ministry of Water and Electricity.

See also 

 List of dams in Saudi Arabia

References 

Dams in Saudi Arabia
Gravity dams
Dams completed in 1970
Jizan Province
1970 establishments in Saudi Arabia